Ausgram is a village in Ausgram I CD block in Bardhaman Sadar North subdivision of Purba Bardhaman district in the state of West Bengal, India.

Overview
Ausgram lies in the Kanksa Ketugram Plain, in the northern part of the district. Bardhaman Sadar North subdivision extends from the Kanksa Ketugram plain, which lies along the Ajay on the north to the Bardhaman Plain, the central plain area of the district, with the Damodar on the south and the east.

Geography

Urbanisation
73.58% of the population of Bardhaman Sadar North subdivision lives in the rural areas. Only 26.42% of the population lives in the urban areas, and that is the highest proportion of urban population amongst the four subdivisions in Purba Bardhaman district. The map alongside presents some of the notable locations in the subdivision. All places marked in the map are linked in the larger full screen map.

Police station
Aushgram police station has jurisdiction over Guskara municipality and parts of Ausgram I and Ausgram II CD Blocks. The area covered is 198.90 km2.

Demographics
As per the 2011 Census of India Ausgram had a total population of 5,533, of which 2,826 (51%) were males and 2,707 (49%) were females. Population below 6 years was 212. The total number of literates in Ausgram was 3,542 (66.57% of the population over 6 years).

Education
Ausgram High School was established in 1954. A co-educational Bengali medium school it has arrangements for teaching from Class V to Class XII.

Healthcare
Bononabagram Rural Hospital at Bononabagram (with 30 beds) is located nearby.

References

Villages in Purba Bardhaman district